Abdallah El Akal (born June 13, 1998) is an Arab-Israeli actor, known for his lead role as Fahed in Zaytoun, co-starring alongside American actor Stephen Dorff. El Akal was born in Tel Aviv and continues to reside there.

Filmography

Film

Television

External links 
 

1998 births
Living people
Arab citizens of Israel
Israeli male film actors
Israeli male television actors